The Renault Mégane E-Tech is an electric car produced by French manufacturer Renault since 2022. It is a five-door hatchback in the small family car market segment. Using the Mégane nameplate, it is the first Renault model based on a dedicated battery electric vehicle platform called the CMF-EV. It was previewed by the Renault Mégane eVision concept car in 2020.

Overview

The Renault Mégane eVision is a concept car that was revealed in October 2020, previewing the Mégane E-Tech. The Mégane E-Tech was previewed by a near-production prototype in June 2021. The production version was revealed at the 2021 IAA in Munich in September 2021, while sales in Europe started in February 2022. The model is intended to go on sale in Australia at the end of 2023, with Renault's Australian distributor saying supply was limited by high-demand in Europe and that they were viewing the Megané E-Tech as "a 2024 model". Production of the internal-combustion engine powered Renault Mégane IV initially continued alongside production of the new electric model. The car uses the CMF-EV platform, which it shares with the larger Nissan Ariya model. The car received a five-star safety rating from Euro NCAP.

Design
Two prototypes were initially presented, with Renault chief-executive-officer Luca de Meo choosing the one with the "sporty" design and the company's design chief commenting on the car's aerodynamics. The car has been noted for having proportions that make its size hard to judge in photographs, being slightly shorter than many other family hatchbacks. The battery is located underneath the floor of the car, and thus the cabin is raised slightly compared to a combustion-engine powered car, being  taller than the Mégane IV. The design has elements which some find reminiscent of 4x4s,, however Top Gear magazine called the car "a normal-size family hatch", Carbuyer said "the Megane is still the family-friendly hatchback it once was", and Autocar called it "resolutely a hatchback". Wheels called it a "small hatch", and said that the car has "crossover design cues" before noting that its dimensions are similar to its predecessor. The Sunday Times called it a "medium-sized hatchback". Top Gear magazine called the car "normal" and "conventionally desirable" when contrasting it to other "pioneer" electric cars. The Irish Independent said the design had elements of both hatchbacks and coupés. In the UK, the Independent said that the design as "different" with "a rather squat profile that is supposed to be coupe-sporty". Euro NCAP classify it as a small family car.

Motor journalists from Car Wow and What Car? found that the car had a high seating position which limited headroom for rear passengers, although the front was considered more spacious. Which? praised the temperature controls for not distracting drivers from looking at the road ahead, but felt that the car's small windows limited the amount the driver can see out the back. Autocar concurred on the latter point, saying "the high window sill line and low roofline that combine to make the car look so good ... results in a very enclosed and oppressive feel, along with severely restricted vision to the rear." Wheels also noted the high glasshouse, saying it would "displease claustrophobic adults". Parker's Car Guides disagreed on this matter, saying "the windows are a good size and shape".

What Car? and Carbuyer made note of the large size of the boot, but were joined by Auto Express in criticising the high sill which some may find it difficult to lift luggage over. The boot's capacity primarily comes from its depth rather than its length. The car does not have a front boot, or "froot", unlike some other electric cars.

Powertrain

The 60 kWh battery that is compatible with fast-charging rates of up to 130 kW, allowing it to reclaim  of range in 30 minutes. It will also be equipped with 26 advanced driver-assistance systems for its Level 2 semi-autonomous driving capabilities. The batteries have been placed in the car in a manner intended to insulate occupants from tyre noise.

References

External links

 Official website (United Kingdom)

Mégane E-Tech
Cars introduced in 2021
Compact cars
Hatchbacks
Front-wheel-drive vehicles
Production electric cars
Electric concept cars
Euro NCAP small family cars